This is a list of Uzbek football transfers in the years of 2009–10 by club. Only transfers of the Uzbek League are provided.

Uzbek League

FK Andijan 

In:
 

Out:

FC Bunyodkor 

In:

Out:

Lokomotiv Tashkent 

In:
 

Out:

Mash'al Mubarek 

In:

Out:

Metalourg Bekabad 

In:
 

Out:

Nasaf Qarshi 

In:
 

Out:

Navbahor Namangan 

In:

Out:

FK Neftchi Farg'ona 

In:

Olmaliq FK 

In:

Out:

FC Pakhtakor Tashkent 

In:

Out:

Qizilqum Zarafshon 

In:

Out:

FK Samarqand-Dinamo 

In:

Out:

FC Shurtan Guzar 

In:
 

Out:

Xorazm FK Urganch 

In:
 

Out:

See also 
Uzbek League
2010 Uzbek League

References

External links 
2010 Uzbek League Transfers- Link

2010
Uzbekistan
Transfers
Uzbek